4185 Phystech, provisional designation , is a Florian or background asteroid from the inner regions of the asteroid belt, approximately  in diameter. It was discovered on 4 March 1975, by Soviet astronomer Tamara Smirnova at the Crimean Astrophysical Observatory in Nauchnij, on the Crimean peninsula. The presumed S-type asteroid has a rotation period of 4.67 hours. It is named in honor of the Moscow Institute of Physics and Technology ("PhysTech") on its 50th anniversary.

Orbit and classification 

Phystech is a non-family asteroid of the main belt's background population when applying the hierarchical clustering method to its proper orbital elements. Based on osculating Keplerian orbital elements, the asteroid has also been classified as a member of the Flora family, a giant asteroid family and the largest family of stony asteroids in the main-belt.

It orbits the Sun in the inner asteroid belt at a distance of 2.0–2.4 AU once every 3 years and 4 months (1,206 days; semi-major axis of 2.22 AU). Its orbit has an eccentricity of 0.10 and an inclination of 2° with respect to the ecliptic. The body's observation arc begins with a precovery taken at Palomar Observatory in October 1953, more than 21 years prior to its official discovery observation at Nauchnij.

Physical characteristics 

Phystech is an assumed stony S-type asteroid, based on its family classification.

Rotation period 

In March and April 2008, two rotational lightcurves of Phystech were obtained from photometric observations by American astronomers at LPL and Calvin College . Lightcurve analysis gave a well-defined rotation period of 4.66883 and 4.66904 hours with a brightness amplitude of 0.53 and 0.41 magnitude, respectively.

Diameter and albedo 

The Collaborative Asteroid Lightcurve Link assumes an albedo of 0.24 – derived from 8 Flora, the parent body of the Flora family – and calculates a diameter of 5.93 kilometers based on an absolute magnitude of 13.3.

Naming 

This minor planet was named after the Moscow Institute of Physics and Technology (informally: "PhysTech"; Физтех) on the occasion of its 50th anniversary in 1996, based on a proposal by the Institute of Theoretical Astronomy (ITA) in Saint Petersburg, Russia. The official naming citation was published by the Minor Planet Center on 22 February 1997.

References

External links 
 Asteroid Lightcurve Database (LCDB), query form (info )
 Dictionary of Minor Planet Names, Google books
 Discovery Circumstances: Numbered Minor Planets (1)-(5000) – Minor Planet Center
 
 

004185
Discoveries by Tamara Mikhaylovna Smirnova
Named minor planets
19750304